Elections were held in Frontenac County, Ontario on October 25, 2010 in conjunction with municipal elections across the province.

Frontenac County Council
The County Council has consisted of the four Township mayors since Amalgamation in 1998.  A by-law was passed in 2009 increasing the size of County Council beginning in the next term (2011 - 2014) to eight members.  The eight members will include the four Township mayors and one additional member from each Township Council.  The additional Council member will be chosen by each Township Council at their inaugural meetings.

Central Frontenac

Frontenac Islands

North Frontenac

South Frontenac

2010 Ontario municipal elections
Frontenac County